The Day of the Donald (subtitled Trump Trumps America!) is a satirical work of fiction by Andrew Shaffer. Published on June 28, 2016, the book imagines Donald Trump winning the US election to become the forty-fifth president (which subsequently occurred) and examines his second year in office.

Plot
The book focuses on the protagonist Jimmie Bernwood, a down-on-his-luck former tabloid reporter, his attempts to ghost-write President Trump's memoir and his investigation into a murder.

References

2016 American novels
American satirical novels
Political satire books
Parodies of Donald Trump